Thomas Hayne (fl. 1401) of Chichester, Sussex, was an English politician.

He was a Member (MP) of the Parliament of England for Chichester in 1401.

References

14th-century births
15th-century deaths
English MPs 1401
People from Chichester